Second Allied Tactical Air Force (2 ATAF) was a NATO military formation under Allied Air Forces Central Europe tasked with providing air support to NATO's Northern Army Group (NORTHAG). 2 ATAF commanded all flying units based within its sector and all reinforcements flying into its sector, as well as ground-based radar systems and stations, air defense units and the airfields in its sector.

Second Allied Tactical Air Force was formed in 1958 with its area of responsibility covering the Netherlands, Belgium, and Germany north of the city of Kassel and south of the Elbe river. Commander of 2 ATAF was the commanding Air Chief Marshal of the British RAF Second Tactical Air Force, which was renamed RAF Germany on 1 January 1959.

A Communication Squadron for 2 ATAF was established in February 1952, and disestablished on 1 January 1959 at RAF Wildenrath, by being redesignated RAF Germany Communication Squadron.

The peacetime headquarters of 2 ATAF were at RAF Rheindahlen, the command center in the case of war for 2 ATAF and NORTHAG was in the Netherlands at Joint Operations Center Maastricht (JOC Maastricht). In 1983 NATO began with the construction of Static War Headquarters Castlegate in Linnich, Germany, as a replacement for JOC Maastricht. Alternate War HQ was located at Kanne (Belgium) north of Fort Eben-Emael. 2 ATAF commanded RAF Germany, the Belgian Air Force, the Royal Netherlands Air Force, two divisions of the German Air Force (Luftwaffe) and one US Air Force Tactical Fighter Group, as well as extensive air defense and radar installations provided by Germany, Belgium and the Netherlands.

If needed 2 ATAF would have been reinforced with units from the US Third (UK based), Eighth (reconnaissance and bombing), Ninth (immediate reinforcements) and Twelfth Air Force (follow on reinforcements), and with French Air Force and Royal Air Force units. At the start of hostilities 2 ATAF would have had immediately around 700 combat planes at its disposal. The following units would have come under 2 ATAF in wartime:

2 ATAF was disbanded on 30 June 1993, its duties were taken over by Allied Air Forces Central Europe.

War time structure c. 1989 

 Headquarters Second Allied Tactical Air Force, RAF Rheindahlen/JOC Maastricht
 Air Defence Operations Center (ADOC), Kanne
 Sector Operations Center 1 (SOC 1), Aurich
 1st Btn, 34th (Luftwaffe) Signal Regiment, Control and Reporting Center Aurich
 2nd Btn, 34th (Luftwaffe) Signal Regiment, Control and Reporting Center Visselhövede
 3rd Btn, 34th (Luftwaffe) Signal Regiment, Control and Reporting Center Brekendorf
Royal Netherlands Air Force, Control and Reporting Center Nieuw Milligen, Netherlands
 No. 225 Squadron, (3× I-Hawk launch stations & 3× Flycatcher/Bofors 40L70 AAA)
 Sector Operations Center 2 (SOC 2), Uedem
 1st Btn, 33rd (Luftwaffe) Signal Regiment, Control and Reporting Center Uedem
 3rd Btn, 33rd (Luftwaffe) Signal Regiment, Control and Reporting Center Brakel
 V. Training Group, 2nd Luftwaffe Technical School, Control and Reporting Center Erndtebrück
Belgian Air Force, Control and Reporting Center Glons, Belgium
 4th Btn, 33rd (Luftwaffe) Regiment, Faßberg, with 12× mobile Radar systems forward deployed to the inner German border.
 Royal Air Force Germany, RAF Rheindahlen
 4 Wing, administrative control of RAF Regiment Rapier squadrons based in West Germany
 33 Wing, administrative control of RAF Regiment Light Armour squadrons based in West Germany
 RAF Bruggen, FRG
 No. 9 Squadron, 12× Tornado GR.1note 1
 No. 14 Squadron, 12× Tornado GR.1note 1
 No. 17 Squadron, 12× Tornado GR.1note 1
 No. 31 Squadron, 12× Tornado GR.1note 1
 No. 37 Squadron RAF Regiment, (Air Defence, 8× Rapier launch stations)
 No. 51 Squadron RAF Regiment, (Light Armour, 15× Spartan, 6× Scorpion)
 RAF Gütersloh, FRG
 No. 3 Squadron, 16× Harrier GR.5
 No. 4 Squadron, 16× Harrier GR.5
 No. 18 Squadron, 16× CH-47 Chinook (supporting British Army of the Rhine)
 No. 230 Squadron, 16× Puma HC.1 (supporting British Army of the Rhine)
 No. 63 Squadron RAF Regiment, (Air Defence, 8× Rapier launch stations)
 RAF Laarbruch, FRG
 No. 2 Squadron, 12× Tornado GR.1A (Reconnaissance)
 No. 15 Squadron, 12× Tornado GR.1note 1
 No. 16 Squadron, 12× Tornado GR.1note 1
 No. 20 Squadron, 12× Tornado GR.1note 1
 No. 1 Squadron RAF Regiment, (Light Armour, 15× Spartan, 6× Scorpion)
 No. 26 Squadron RAF Regiment, (Air Defence, 8× Rapier launch stations)
 RAF Wildenrath, FRG
 No. 19 Squadron, 16x Phantom FGR.2
 No. 92 Squadron, 16x Phantom FGR.2
 No. 60 Squadron, Andover CC.2 transport planes
 No. 16 Squadron RAF Regiment, (Air Defence, 8× Rapier launch stations)
 US Air Force
 485th Tactical Missile Wing, Florennes Air Base, BE
 71st Tactical Missile Squadron, 48× BGM-109G Ground Launched Cruise Missiles
 Soesterberg Air Base, NL
 32d Tactical Fighter Group
 32d Tactical Fighter Squadron, 24× F-15C Eagle
 No. 221 (Dutch) Squadron, (3× I-Hawk launch stations)
 Nörvenich Air Base
 Forward deployed detachment of the 81st Tactical Fighter Wing, 8× A-10A Thunderbolt II
 Ahlhorn air base
 Forward deployed detachment of the 81st Tactical Fighter Wing, 8× A-10A Thunderbolt II 
 Jever Air Base
 Forward deployed detachment of the 81st Tactical Fighter Wing, 8× A-10A Thunderbolt II  
 Belgian Air Force
1st Wing, Beauvechain Air Base
349th Squadron, 24× F-16A Fighting Falcon
 350th Squadron, 24× F-16A Fighting Falcon
 2nd Wing, Florennes Air Base
1st Squadron, 24× F-16A Fighting Falcon
 2nd Squadron, 24× F-16A Fighting Falcon
 3rd Wing, Bierset Air Base
 8th Squadron, 36× Mirage 5BA
 42nd Squadron, 22× Mirage 5BR (Reconnaissance)
 9th Wing, Sint-Truiden Air Base
 7th Squadron, 16× Alpha Jet's
 11th Squadron, 16× Alpha Jets
 10th Wingnote 2, Kleine Brogel Air Base
 23rd Squadron, 24× F-16A Fighting Falcon
 31st Squadron, 24× F-16A Fighting Falcon
 Missile Wing, Düren, FRG
 Wing Staff, Düren
 9th Operations Group, Grefrath, FRG
 54th Squadron, Xanten, (9x MIM-14 Nike Hercules launch stations, disbanded 1989)
 56th Squadron, Grefrath, (9x MIM-14 Nike Hercules launch stations)
 13th Operations Group, Düren, FRG
 50th Squadron, Düren, (9x MIM-14 Nike Hercules launch stations)
 51st Squadron, Blankenheim, (9x MIM-14 Nike Hercules launch stations, disbanded 1989)
 Missile Support Group, Düren, FRG
 Belgian Army
 43rd Artilleriebataljon, Brakel
 A/43rd Company, Beverungen with 6× MIM-23 Hawk stations
 B/43rd Company, Höxter with 6× Hawk launch stations
 C/43rd Company, Brakel with 6× Hawk launch stations
 D/43rd Company, Bad Driburg 6× Hawk launch stations
 62nd Artilleriebataljon, Essentho
 A/62nd Company, Korbach with 6× MIM-23 Hawk stations
 B/62nd Company, Wolfhagen with 6× Hawk launch stations
 C/62nd Company, Essentho with 6× Hawk launch stations
 D/62nd Company, Diemelstadt 6× Hawk launch stations
 Royal Netherlands Air Force
 Eindhoven Air Base
  No. 316 Fighter/Bomber Squadron, 18× NF-5A Freedom Fighter
  No. 422 Squadron, (3× I-Hawk launch stations & 3× Flycatcher/Bofors 40L70 AAA)
 Gilze-Rijen Air Base
  No. 314 Fighter/Bomber Squadron, 18× NF-5A Freedom Fighter
  No. 121 Squadron, (3x I-Hawk launch stations & 3× Flycatcher/Bofors 40L70 AAA)
 Leeuwarden Air Base
 No. 322 Fighter/Bomber Squadron, 24× F-16A Fighting Falcon
  No. 323 Fighter/Bomber Squadron, 24× F-16A Fighting Falcon
  No. 119 Squadron, (3x I-Hawk launch stations & 3× Flycatcher/Bofors 40L70 AAA)
 Twente Air Base
  No. 313 Fighter/Bomber Squadron, 24× F-16A Fighting Falcon
  No. 315 Fighter/Bomber Squadron, 24× F-16A Fighting Falcon
  No. 222 Squadron, (3× I-Hawk launch stations & 3× Flycatcher/Bofors 40L70 AAA)
 Volkel Air Base
  No. 306 Reconnaissance Squadron, 18× F-16A F-16A Fighting Falcon (Reconnaissance)
  No. 311 Fighter/Bomber Squadron, 24× F-16A F-16A Fighting Falconnote 2
  No. 312 Fighter/Bomber Squadron, 24× F-16A F-16A Fighting Falconnote 2
  No. 420 Squadron, (3× I-Hawk launch stations & 3× Flycatcher/Bofors 40L70 AAA)
 De Peel Air Base (for reinforcements)
  No. 421 Squadron, (3× I-Hawk launch stations & 3× Flycatcher/Bofors 40L70 AAA)
 3rd Guided Weapons Group, Blomberg
 No. 324 Squadron, Aerzen with 6× I-Hawk launch stations
 No. 326 Squadron, Horn-Bad Meinberg with 6× I-Hawk launch stations
 No. 327 Squadron, Schwelentrup with 5× MIM-104 Patriot launch stations
 No. 328 Squadron, Schwalenberg with 5× Patriot launch stations
 5th Guided Weapons Group, Stolzenau
 No. 500 Squadron, Borstel with 6× I-Hawk launch stations
 No. 501 Squadron, Winzlar with 6× I-Hawk launch stations
 No. 502 Squadron, Hoysinghausen with 5× Patriot launch stations
 No. 503 Squadron, Reinsdorf with 5× Patriot launch stations
 German Air Force
 3rd Luftwaffendivision, Kalkar
 Geilenkirchen
Missile Wing 2, 4× squadrons with 9× Pershing 1a each
 Nörvenich Air Base
 Jagdbombergeschwader 31note 2, 2× squadrons with 16× Tornado IDS each, and 6× Tornado IDS in reserve
 Rheine-Hopsten Air Base
 Jagdbombergeschwader 36, 2x squadrons with 15× F-4F Phantom II each, and 15× F-4F in reserve
 Jever Air Base
 Jagdbombergeschwader 38, 1st squadron with 24× Tornados IDS (Tornado Weapons Training Sqn.), 2nd squadron with 16× Tornado ECR, and 4× Tornado IDS in reserve
 Oldenburg Air Base
 Jagdbombergeschwader 43, 2x squadrons with 18× Alpha Jet's each, and 8× Alpha Jets in reserve 
 4th Luftwaffendivision, Aurich
 Wittmundhafen Air Base
 Jagdgeschwader 71, 2× squadrons with 15× F-4F Phantom II each, and 4× F-4F in reserve
 1st Air Defense Missile Command, Heide
 26th Air Defense Missile Wing, Heide, with 6× MIM-104 Patriot squadrons; each with 1× Engagement Control Station, 1× Radar Set, 8× launch stations
 37th Air Defense Missile Wing, Cuxhaven, with 4× MIM-23 Hawk squadrons; each with 6× launch stations
 39th Air Defense Missile Wing, Eckernförde, with 4× MIM-23 Hawk squadrons; each with 6× launch stations
 2nd Air Defense Missile Command, Bremervörde
 24th Air Defense Missile Wing, Delmenhorst, with 6× MIM-104 Patriot squadrons; each with 1× Engagement Control Station, 1× Radar Set, 8× launch stations
 31st Air Defense Missile Wing, Westertimke, with 4× MIM-23 Hawk squadrons; each with 6× launch stations
 36th Air Defense Missile Wing, Bremervörde, with 4× MIM-23 Hawk squadrons; each with 6× launch stations
 3rd Air Defense Missile Command, Oldenburg
 25th Air Defense Missile Wing, Eydelstedt, with 6× MIM-104 Patriot squadrons; each with 1× Engagement Control Station, 1× Radar Set, 8× launch stations
 35th Air Defense Missile Wing, Delmenhorst, with 4× MIM-23 Hawk squadrons; each with 6× launch stations
 41st Air Defense Missile Group, Wangerland, with 16× Roland systems guarding  Jever, Hopsten and Wittmundhafen Air Base
 33rd Signal Regiment, Goch
 34th Signal Regiment, Alt Duvenstedt

Note 1: Royal Air Force unit with nuclear strike role with 18x WE.177 tactical nuclear weapons.
Note 2: Nuclear sharing unit capable of delivering B61 tactical nuclear weapons.

See also
Fourth Allied Tactical Air Force

References

 O. W. Dragoner, Die Bundeswehr 1989 Volume 2.1, available here
 O. W. Dragoner, Die Bundeswehr 1989 Volume 3, available here

Structures of military commands and formations in 1989
Formations of the NATO Military Command Structure 1952–1994
Military units and formations established in 1958
Military units and formations disestablished in 1993
Tactical air forces
Multinational air units and formations
Military history of Europe